Saeed Anwar (alias Aryana, January 28, 1975 – December 10, 2015) was born in Haider Khel Village of North Waziristan Agency.
He was a member of Tehrik-i-Taliban Pakistan (TTP) with Maulana Sadiq Noor Group.
He was a well known militant in North Waziristan. He was killing people, also Pakistani Army soldiers.
In June 2014, when Pakistan military launched operation Zarb-e-Azb, He was escaped to Afghanistan.

On December 10, 2015, Afghan Security Forces killed Aryana, a key commander of TTP, and arrested his 15 accomplices in a raid carried out near the Pak-Afghan border in Paktia province, Afghanistan. Aryana remained a closed friend of TTP head Hakimullah Mehsud till his death in a US drone strike in North Waziristan.
Aryana was also close to local Taliban commander Maulana Sadiq Noor in North Waziristan.
Khan Said Sajna TTP Mehsood Taliban head was also killed in the raid, but Taliban sources said that Sajna was alive and remained safe after the raid.

References 

1975 births
2015 deaths
People from North Waziristan